Phoebe Asiyo (born September 12, 1932) is a former parliamentarian of Kenya, ambassador to the United Nations Development Fund for Women (UNIFEM), mother, and grandmother. She was UNIFEM's ambassador from 1988 to 1992. She was the first woman elevated to the position of Luo elder for her efforts to promote education for girls, women's rights, and gender equality in Kenya. Fondly called Mama Asiyo, she has dedicated her life to improving the political arena in Kenya, the role of women and girls, and those affected by the HIV epidemic. She was the first woman in Kenya with its 42 communities to become elder.

Career

Pre-2000 
Mama Phoebe went to Gemba Primary school and later joined high school at Kamagambo, in Migori County, and then attended Kangaru Teachers College in Embu County.

She joined the Maendeleo Ya Wanawake Organisation in 1953 and was elected president of the same in 1958. During her tenure, she advocated for the economic empowerment of the African woman through establishing small scale businesses and advocating for better farming methods. She further lobbied for the improvement of women and maternal health care and nutrition and more involvement of women in the three arms of government.
She became the first African Woman Senior Superintendent of Women's Prison in 1963 on the eve of independence. 

Hon. Phoebe Asiyo was elected to Kenyan parliament from the Karachuonyo seat in 1980 and held the seat until 1983, when parliament was dissolved. She was reelected to parliament in 1992 after the multi-party system came into being, and she continued to serve until 1997. She holds the distinction of being one of the longest-serving women in parliament in Kenya.

She was the UNIFEM ambassador from 1988 to 1992.

Post-2000 
In 2001 Hon Phoebe was selected to be a Commissioner of the Constitution Review Committee (CRC)
Asiyo was part of the delegation to Uganda to advocate for the participation of women in the peace talks in Uganda.

She currently serves as chair of the Caucus for Women's Leadership, formerly called the Kenya Women's Political Caucus, where she mentors young women and advocates for women in leadership roles.
In 2018 she launched her memoir: IT IS POSSIBLE at a ceremony that was graced by HE President Uhuru Kenyatta, the deputy president, former prime ministers alongside other notable government officials and women Leaders.

Notable Memberships
 Member of parliamentarians  of Global Action 
 Goodwill ambassador for united Nations Development Fund for Women of AFRICA
 Commissioner in the Constitution of Kenya Review Commission (CKRC)
 Delegate to the UN General Assembly and the UN Commission on the Status of Women.
 Consultant for the United Nations Economic Commission for Africa.
 Chairperson of the Kenya National Council of Women.
 Caucus for Women's Leadership.

Honors and awards
 Order of the Golden Warrior: 1st class chief of the burning spear.
 Doctor of Humane Letters from Lehigh University
 Honorary Doctorate Law Degree from the University of York (2002).

References

1932 births
Living people
Politics of Kenya
Kenyan politicians
20th-century Kenyan women politicians
20th-century Kenyan politicians
Kenyan human rights activists
 Kenyan women activists